Adolfo Suárez Madrid–Barajas Airport , commonly known as Madrid–Barajas Airport, is the main international airport serving Madrid in Spain. At  in area, it is the second-largest airport in Europe by physical size behind Paris–Charles de Gaulle Airport. In 2019, 61.8 million passengers travelled through Madrid–Barajas, making it the country's busiest airport as well as Europe's sixth-busiest.

The airport opened in 1931 and has grown to be one of Europe's most important aviation centres. The airport name derives from the adjacent district of Barajas, which has its own metro station on the same rail line serving the airport. Barajas serves as the gateway to the Iberian peninsula from the rest of Europe and the world and is a key link between Europe and Latin America. Following the death of former Spanish Prime Minister, Adolfo Suárez, in 2014, the Spanish Ministry of Public Works and Transport announced that the airport was to be renamed Aeropuerto Adolfo Suárez, Madrid–Barajas. The airport is the primary hub and maintenance base for Iberia and Air Europa. Consequently, Iberia is responsible for more than 40% of Barajas's traffic. The airport has five passenger terminals: T1, T2, T3, T4 and T4S.

History

Early years

The airport was constructed in 1927, opening to national and international air traffic on 22 April 1931, although regular commercial operations began two years later. A small terminal was constructed with a capacity for 30,000 passengers a year, in addition to several hangars and the building of the Avión Club. The first regular flight was established by Lineas Aéreas Postales Españolas (LAPE) with its route to Barcelona. In the 1930s, flights started to serve some European and African destinations, the first international flights from the airport.

Originally, the flight field was a large circle bordered in white with the name of Madrid in its interior, unpaved, consisting of land covered with natural grass. It was not until the 1940s that the flight field was paved and new runways were designed. The first runway which started operation in 1944 was 1,400 metres long and 45 metres wide. By the end of the decade the airport had three runways, none of which exist today. In the late 1940s, scheduled flights to Latin America and the Philippines started.

In the 1950s, the airport supported over half a million passengers, increasing to five runways and scheduled flights to New York City began. The National Terminal, currently T2, began construction in 1954 and opened later that year. In the Plan of Airports of 1957, Barajas Airport is classified as a first-class international airport. By the 1970s, large jets were landing at Barajas, and the growth of traffic mainly as a result of tourism exceeded forecasts. At the beginning of the decade, the airport reached the 1.2 million passengers, double that envisaged in the Plan of Airports of 1957.

In the 1970s, with the boom in tourism and the arrival of the Boeing 747, the airport reached 4 million passengers and began the construction of the international terminal (current T1). In 1974, Iberia, L.A.E. introduced the shuttle service between Madrid and Barcelona, a service with multiple daily frequencies and available without prior reservation.

The 1982 FIFA World Cup brought significant expansion and modernisation of the airport's two existing terminals.

In the 1990s, the airport expanded further. In 1994, the first cargo terminal was constructed and the control tower was renovated. In 1997, it opened the North Dock, which is used as an exclusive terminal for Iberia's Schengen flights. In 1998, it inaugurated a new control tower, 71 m tall and then in 1999 the new South Dock opened, which implies an expansion of the international terminal. During this time, the distribution of the terminals changed: The south dock and most of the International Terminal were now called T1, the rest of the International Terminal and Domestic Terminal were now called T2 and the north dock was called T3.

In November 1998, the new runway 18R-36L started operations (replacing the previous 18–36), 4,400 m long, one of the largest in Europe under expansion plans called Major Barajas. In 2000, it began the construction of new terminals T4 and its satellite, T4S, designed by architects Antonio Lamela, Richard Rogers and Luis Vidal. Two parallel runways to the existing ones were also built.

Development since the 2000s
The new terminals and runways were completed in 2004, but was not in service until 5 February 2006.

Terminal 4, designed by Antonio Lamela, Richard Rogers and Luis Vidal, (winning team of the 2006 Stirling Prize) and TPS Engineers, (winning team of the 2006 IStructE Award for Commercial Structures) was built by Ferrovial and inaugurated on 5 February 2006. Terminal 4 is one of the world's largest airport terminals in terms of area, with 760,000 square meters (8,180,572 square feet) in separate landside and airside structures. It consists of a main building, T4 (470,000 m2) and a satellite building, T4S (290,000 m2), which are approximately 2.5 km apart. The new Terminal 4 is designed to give passengers a stress-free start to their journey. This is managed through careful use of illumination, with glass panes instead of walls and numerous skylights which allow natural light into the structure. With this new addition, Barajas is designed to handle 70 million passengers annually.

During the construction of Terminal 4, two more runways (15L/33R and 18L/36R) were constructed to aid in the flow of air traffic arriving and departing from Barajas. These runways were officially inaugurated on 5 February 2006 (together with the terminals), but had already been used on several occasions beforehand to test flight and air traffic manoeuvres. Thus, Barajas came to have four runways: two on a north–south axis and parallel to each other (separated by 1.8 km) and two on a northwest–southeast axis (and separated by 2.5 km). This allowed simultaneous takeoffs and landings into the airport, allowing 120 operations an hour (one takeoff or landing every 30 seconds).

Terminals 1, 2 and 3 are adjacent terminals that are home to SkyTeam and Star Alliance airlines. Terminal 4 is home to Iberia, its franchise Air Nostrum and all Oneworld partner airlines. Gate numbers are continuous in terminals 1, 2 and 3 (A1 to E89), but are separately numbered in terminal 4 (H, J, K and M, R, S, U in satellite building).

The Madrid–Barcelona air shuttle service, known as the "Puente Aéreo" (in Spanish), literally called "Air Bridge", used to be the busiest route between two EU airports with 55 daily flights in 2012. The schedule has been reduced since the February 2008 opening of the Madrid–Barcelona high-speed rail line which covers the distance in  hours. Subsequently, the route has been overtaken by London-Dublin and Paris-Toulouse.

On the morning of 30 December 2006, an explosion took place in the carpark building module D attached to Terminal 4. Authorities received a bomb threat at approximately 8:15 local time (7:15 GMT), with the caller stating that a car bomb carried with 800 kg of explosive would explode at 9:00 local time (8:00 GMT). After receiving the warning, police were able to evacuate part of the airport. Later, an anonymous caller stated that ETA claims responsibility for the bombing. As a result of the explosion, two Ecuadorians who were sleeping in their cars died. The whole module D of the car park was levelled creating around 40,000 tonnes of debris. It took workers six days to recover the body of the second victim from the rubble.
 
In 2007, the airport processed more than 52 million passengers. Barajas was voted "Best Airport" in the 2008 Condé Nast Traveller Reader Awards.

In December 2010, the Spanish government announced plans to tender Madrid–Barajas airport to companies in the private sector for a period of up to 40 years.

On 27 January 2012, Spanair suspended all flights affecting Madrid–Barajas as well as other domestic and international connections. On 20 September 2012, both runways 15/33 were renamed as 14R/32L (the longest) and 14L/32R (the shortest).

On 1 August 2015, the first scheduled Airbus A380 flight landed in Madrid-Barajas in a daily service to Dubai by Emirates.

Following the death of former Spanish Prime Minister, Adolfo Suárez, in 2014, the Spanish Ministry of Public Works and Transport announced that the airport would be renamed Aeropuerto Adolfo Suárez, Madrid–Barajas. This renaming seeks recognition for Suárez's role as the first Prime Minister of Spain after the restoration of democracy and his key participation in the transition to democracy after the dictatorship of Francisco Franco.

In late 2018 and early 2019, Iberia renovated its two lounges in Terminal 4, the Dali and Velazquez lounges.

In December 2019, the airport's operator Aena announced plans to significantly expand and renovate the existing installations, increasing their yearly capacity from 70 to 80 million passengers and bridging the architectural gap between the original Terminals 1, 2 and 3 and the newer Terminal 4. The project has a budget of 750 million Euro and is set to be executed in the period from 2022 to 2026.

Airlines and destinations

Passenger

The following airlines serve regular scheduled and charter routes to and from Madrid:

Cargo

Traffic and statistics

Passenger numbers

Route statistics

Airline market share

Medical care 
The airport is attached to the Ramón y Cajal University Hospital in Madrid as a referral hospital for medical and surgical emergencies requiring hospital care.

In addition, the airport itself has medical rooms and medical personnel attached to the Airport Medical Service to cover transit passengers who need medical attention. It also has 75 Cardiac Rescue Points equipped with defibrillators in the event of cardiorespiratory arrest.

Ground transport

Taxi
All terminals have clearly signed taxi ranks outside the arrivals area. Official taxis are white with a red stripe and have the Madrid City Council coat-of-arms on their doors.

Rail
The Madrid Metro Line connects the airport with city centre station Nuevos Ministerios in Madrid's financial district. The Barajas Line 8 provides a fast route from the underground stations at Terminal 2 (access to T1 and T3) and Terminal 4 into central Madrid. The metro also provides links to stations on the Spanish railway network.

In October 2006, a bid was launched for the construction of a Cercanías link between Chamartín Station and Terminal 4. Now finished, this single Cercanías Line (C-1) links Madrid Barajas Terminal 4, with Chamartín Station and Atocha AVE high-speed train stations. In June 2011 a decision was made to equip this link with dual gauge which will allow AVE high-speed trains to reach the airport station.

The Nuevos Ministerios metro station opened a satellite check-in center in 2002 right by the AZCA business area in central Madrid; the satellite check-in center was permanently closed in 2006 due to security concerns.

Metropolitan Bus
EMT (Madrid Municipal Transport Company) runs regular public bus services between the airport and Madrid (Avenida de América station): bus 200 runs as a complete line – dropping passengers at departures of terminals 1, 2 and 4 before collecting passengers in the reverse order at arrivals. The EMT public night bus service N4 (nicknamed "Buho", Owl) also services from Madrid downtown (Plaza Cibeles) to Barajas (Plaza de los Hermanos Falcó y Alvarez de Toledo, 400m from the airport through a passageway above the highway). EMT also have an express bus linking Barajas airport to Renfe's Atocha Station, the main rail station in Madrid, during day and Plaza Cibeles during night. Unlike the two services mentioned above, this line runs 24 hours of the day during all the days of the year.

CRTM (Consorcio Regional de Transportes de Madrid) runs four bus services between the airport and nearby cities in the metropolitan area:

 822: T1 - Coslada - San Fernando de Henares
 824: T2 - Torrejón de Ardoz - Alcalá de Henares
 827: Canillejas - T4 - Alcobendas - Universidad Autónoma de Madrid - Tres Cantos
 828: Canillejas - T4 - Alcobendas - Universidad Autónoma de Madrid

Long distance coaches
From terminals T1 and T4 the bus company Avanzabus operates routes to Ávila, Castellón, Salamanca, Valencia and Zamora. From terminal T4 the Alsa bus company runs services to the cities of Zaragoza, Barcelona, Valladolid, León, Murcia, Alicante, Gijón, Oviedo, Lugo, Coruña, Santiago de Compostela, Burgos, Vitoria, San Sebastián, Santander, Bilbao, Logroño and Pamplona. From terminal T1 the Socibus company runs services to the major cities in Andalusia: Huelva, Córdoba, Cadiz, Jerez and Seville.

Airport People Mover 

In early 2006, the first driverless transit system in Spain and the longest airport people mover system in Europe began transporting passengers between the new terminal (T4) and a new satellite terminal (T4S). Deploying the CITYFLO 550 automatic train control technology, the system is the only mode of transportation for passengers between the two terminals, which are spaced more than two kilometres apart. Bombardier became the only contractor for the completely underground shuttle system, including the construction of the civil works, operation and maintenance of the system.

Airport parking
Long- and short-term car parking is provided at the airport with seven public parking areas. P1 is an outdoor car park located in front of the terminal building; P2 is an indoor car park with direct access to terminals T2 and T3. A Parking 'Express' facility, available for short periods only, is located at Terminal 2 and dedicated long-term parking is also available with 1,655 spaces; a free shuttle operates between the long-stay car park and all terminals. There are also VIP car parks.

Incidents and accidents
 On 4 January 1951, a Lockheed Model 18 Lodestar of Ejército del Aire crashed when an engine failed after takeoff. It was on a delivery flight to the Spanish Air Force. Both occupants were killed.
 On 30 September 1972, a Douglas C-47B EC-AQE of Spantax crashed on takeoff. The aircraft was being used for training duties and the student pilot over-rotated and stalled. One of the six people on board was killed.
 On May 9, 1976, a Boeing 747 of the Imperial Iranian Air Force was struck by lightning while on approach. This caused the left wing's fuel tank to explode and the wing itself to separate, resulting in the aircraft to crash and killing all 17 passengers and crew.
 On 27 November 1983, Avianca Flight 011 crashed while attempting to land. Flight 011 struck a series of hills, causing the plane's right wing to break off. The 747 then cartwheeled, shattering into five pieces before coming to rest upside-down. Only 11 of the 169 passengers survived – there were no survivors among the 23 crew.
 On 7 December 1983, an Iberia 727 operating as Iberia Flight 350 collided during takeoff with Aviaco Flight 134, a DC-9 The Aviaco DC-9 had accidentally entered the runway as the Iberia flight was taking off. Ninety-three people were killed, including 51 from the Iberia 727 and 42 from the Aviaco DC-9.
 On 15 July 2006, the winglet of a Thai Airways International Boeing 747-400 HS-TGY operating flight TG943 from Madrid Barajas Airport in Spain to Rome Leonardo da Vinci-Fiumicino Airport cut off the tail of an Air France ERJ-145 while taxiing to the runway for take-off. No injuries were reported.
 On 20 August 2008, Spanair Flight 5022 which was travelling to Gran Canaria, veered off to the right and into the ground while climbing immediately after lifting off from runway 36L at 14:45 local time. The McDonnell Douglas MD-82 with registration "EC-HFP", was carrying 172 people, including 162 passengers. In the accident, 154 people were killed, two were seriously injured and 12 were slightly injured. Prime Minister Zapatero ordered three days of national mourning.

References

External links

 Official website

1931 establishments in Spain
 
Airports established in 1931
Airports in the Community of Madrid
Barajas (Madrid)
Buildings and structures in Barajas District, Madrid
Richard Rogers buildings